Joseph Connaughton was a state legislator in Louisiana. He was elected to two terms. He only served part of his second term in the Louisiana House of Representatives. He was African American.

He represented Rapides Parish, Louisiana in the Louisiana House of Representatives from 1872 until 1875 when he lost his seat due to the Wheeler Compromise.

He was part of the 1873 Louisiana Colored Men's Convention in New Orleans. He served on the Committee on Canals and Drainage.

See also
African-American officeholders during and following the Reconstruction era

References

Members of the Louisiana House of Representatives
Year of birth missing
Year of death missing
African-American state legislators in Louisiana
African-American politicians during the Reconstruction Era